Hypericum montanum is a plant species in the genus Hypericum commonly known as pale St. John's-wort or mountain St. John's wort. It is native to Eurasia and Morocco in North Africa.

Description
Hypericum montanum are normally from 20 to 80 centimeters (8–32 inches). Its flower has five petals and it flowers from July to August.

References

montanum
Flora of Asia
Flora of Europe
Flora of Morocco